Steven Price (born in Victoria, British Columbia) is a Canadian poet and novelist.

He graduated from the University of Victoria with a BFA in 2000, and from the University of Virginia with an MFA, in poetry.

He teaches poetry and fiction at the University of Victoria. He lives with his partner, novelist Esi Edugyan, in Victoria, British Columbia.

Awards
2007 - Gerald Lampert Award
2013 - ReLit Award for poetry
2016 - By Gaslight longlisted for Scotiabank Giller Prize
2019 - Lampedusa shortlisted for the Giller Prize

Works

Poetry
"Images", Canadian Literature #179: Literature & War (Winter 2003)
The Anatomy of Keys (Brick Books, 2006), 
Omens in the Year of the Ox (Brick Books, 2012),

Fiction
Into That Darkness (2011)
By Gaslight (2016)
Lampedusa (2019)
Ordinary Monsters (2022) under the pseudonym J.M. Miro

Personal life
Price lives in Victoria, British Columbia, and is married to Canadian novelist Esi Edugyan. Their first child was born in August 2011, their second in 2014.

References

Year of birth missing (living people)
University of Victoria alumni
Academic staff of the University of Victoria
University of Virginia alumni
Living people
Canadian male novelists
Writers from Victoria, British Columbia
21st-century Canadian novelists
21st-century Canadian poets
Canadian male poets
21st-century Canadian male writers